Imene Merrouche (born 25 April 1994) is an Algerian footballer who plays for FC Constantine and the Algeria national team.

She played for Algeria at the 2014 African Women's Championship and the 2018 Africa Women Cup of Nations, where she scored for Algeria in the match against Mali.

References

1994 births
Living people
Algerian women's footballers
Algeria women's international footballers
Women's association football forwards
21st-century Algerian people